3C 20 is a radio galaxy located in the constellation Cassiopeia.

References

Notes

Radio galaxies
Cassiopeia (constellation)
020
+51.02
2817481